Lee County is a county located in east central Alabama. As of the 2020 census the population was 174,241. The county seat is Opelika, and the largest city is Auburn. The county was established in 1866 and is named for General Robert E. Lee (1807–1870), who served as General in Chief of the Armies of the Confederate States in 1865. Lee County comprises the Auburn-Opelika, AL Metropolitan Statistical Area, which is included in the Columbus-Auburn-Opelika, GA-AL Combined Statistical Area.

History
Lee County was established by the State Legislature on December 5, 1866, comprising parts of Macon, Tallapoosa, Chambers, and Russell counties. In an election to determine the county seat, Opelika was chosen over Auburn and Salem. In 1923, Phenix City, located in the southeastern corner of Lee County, merged with the town of Girard, located in the northeastern corner of Russell County. This territory is what forms the southern "panhandle" of Lee County. Even after the land swap with Russell County, however, the city limits of present-day Phenix City stretch into the southeastern corner of Lee. On March 3, 2019, a series of tornadoes hit the county, killing 23 people and injuring others. The deaths and injuries occurred in the community of Beauregard, situated south-east of the Auburn-Opelika metropolitan area.

Geography

The county straddles the fall line between the Piedmont region to the north, and the Gulf coastal plain to the south. Thus, northern areas of the county are hillier compared to southern areas of the county.

Major highways

  Interstate 85
  U.S. Highway 29
  U.S. Highway 80
  U.S. Highway 280
  U.S. Highway 431
  State Route 14
  State Route 51
  State Route 147
  State Route 169

Adjacent counties
 Chambers County (north)
 Harris County, Georgia (northeast)
 Muscogee County, Georgia (east)
 Russell County (south)
 Macon County (southwest)
 Tallapoosa County (northwest)

Railroads
 CSX A&WP Subdivision
 Norfolk Southern Central of Georgia District

Demographics

2000 Census
At the 2000 census there were 115,092 people, 45,702 households, and 27,284 families living in the county. The racial makeup of the county was 74.1% White, 22.7% Black or African American, 0.2% Native American, 1.6% Asian, <0.1% Pacific Islander, 0.5% from other races, and 0.9% from two or more races.  1.4% of the population were Hispanic or Latino of any race.
Of the 45,702 households 29.7% had children under the age of 18 living with them, 44.1% were married couples living together, 11.8% had a female householder with no husband present, and 40.3% were non-families. 27.8% of households were one person and 5.7% were one person aged 65 or older.  The average household size was 2.42 and the average family size was 3.03.

The age distribution was 23.3% under the age of 18, 22.7% from 18 to 24, 28.1% from 25 to 44, 17.8% from 45 to 64, and 8.1% 65 or older.  The median age was 28 years. For every 100 females, there were 96.90 males.  For every 100 females age 18 and over, there were 95.20 males.

The median household income was $30,952 and the median family income  was $46,781. Males had a median income of $33,598 versus $23,228 for females. The per capita income for the county was $17,158.  About 11.1% of families and 21.8% of the population were below the poverty line, including 16.3% of those under age 18 and 12.0% of those age 65 or over.

2010 census
At the 2010 census there were 140,247 people, 55,682 households, and 33,692 families living in the county. The racial makeup of the county was 71.3% White, 22.7% Black or African American, 0.3% Native American, 2.6% Asian, 0.1% Pacific Islander, 1.3% from other races, and 1.6% from two or more races. 3.3% of the population were Hispanic or Latino of any race.
Of the 55,682 households 28.0% had children under the age of 18 living with them, 43.1% were married couples living together, 13.0% had a female householder with no husband present, and 39.5% were non-families. 27.9% of households were one person and 6.0% were one person aged 65 or older. The average household size was 2.44 and the average family size was 3.03.

The age distribution was 22.5% under the age of 18, 20.5% from 18 to 24, 26.1% from 25 to 44, 21.8% from 45 to 64, and 9.1% 65 or older. The median age was 28.3 years. For every 100 females, there were 97.2 males. For every 100 females age 18 and over, there were 98.0 males.

The median household income was $40,894 and the median family income  was $59,112. Males had a median income of $42,335 versus $31,766 for females. The per capita income for the county was $22,794. About 11.0% of families and 19.2% of the population were below the poverty line, including 19.0% of those under age 18 and 9.0% of those age 65 or over.

2020 Census

As of the 2020 United States census, there were 174,241 people, 64,448 households, and 37,809 families residing in the county.

Government
Among the principal governmental functions vested in Alabama counties are law enforcement; tax assessment, levy and collection; administration of decedent's estates and probate matters; maintenance of real and personal property title records; construction and maintenance of public roads and bridges; and maintenance of the county courthouse, which provides office space for various county officials and departments. Lee County is one of only seven counties in Alabama that has been granted limited home rule. It is governed by a six-member county commission, composed of the Probate Judge and five commissioners.  The Probate Judge is elected countywide for a six-year term and serves as chairman of the commission.  The other commissioners are elected from single-member districts for four-year terms.  Each commissioner must be a registered voter and live within the district they represent.  Terms are staggered so that three commissioners are elected in one election cycle, and the other two members are elected in the next election cycle two years later.

The County Commission employs a County Administrator, who serves as its chief administrative officer.  It is the responsibility of the County Administrator to carry out the policies and directives of the Commission, and for the development and management of the County's annual operating budget. The Administrator serves as the budgetary agent for all county offices.  The County Administrator is also responsible for the supervision and management of various department heads, and for ensuring that all agreements, leases and other contractual obligations of the Commission are properly performed.  The County Administrator works with Lee County Commissioners and other elected county officials to facilitate the delivery of quality and effective services to the citizens of Lee County.

Lee County is very conservative for a county dominated by a college town. While other such counties have swung heavily to the Democrats since the 1990s, Lee County has not supported a Democrat for president since 1960. The last Democrat to garner over 40 percent of the county's vote was Jimmy Carter in both of his election campaigns in 1976 and 1980. However, Bill Clinton tallied over 38 percent of the county's vote in both of his successful runs for president, as did Barack Obama in both of his campaigns.

Education
Lee County is home to Auburn University, a large comprehensive public university, and Southern Union State Community College, a two-year degree and technical college.

Communities

Cities
 Auburn
 Opelika (county seat)
 Phenix City (partly in Russell County)
 Smiths Station

Towns
 Loachapoka
 Notasulga (partly in Macon County)
 Waverly (partly in Chambers County)

Unincorporated communities

 Beans Mill
 Beauregard
 Bee Hive
 Beulah
 Chewacla
 Gold Hill
 Hopewell
 Marvyn
 Roxana
 Salem
 The Bottle

Places of interest
Lee County is home to Auburn University Museum of Natural History, Chewacla State Park, the Jule Collins Smith Museum of Fine Art, Bean's Mill, the Salem-Shotwell Covered Bridge and the Grand National Golf course which is part of the Robert Trent Jones Golf Trail.

Gallery

See also

 List of memorials to Robert E. Lee
 National Register of Historic Places listings in Lee County, Alabama
 Properties on the Alabama Register of Landmarks and Heritage in Lee County, Alabama

References

Further reading
 Barnes, Margaret Anne (1998). The Tragedy and the Triumph of Phenix City, Alabama.  Macon, GA: Mercer University Press.  
 Nunn, Alexander (Ed.) (1983). Lee County and Her Forebears.  Montgomery: Herff Jones.    
 Wright, John Peavy (1969).  Glimpses into the past from my Grandfather's Trunk.  Alexander City: Outlook Publishing Company, Inc.

External links
 

 

 
1866 establishments in Alabama
Auburn metropolitan area, Alabama
Columbus metropolitan area, Georgia
Lee County, Mississippi